This is a list of the currently operational lighthouses of the Northern Lighthouse Board (NLB). The list is divided by geographical location, and then by whether the lighthouses are classed by the NLB as a 'major lighthouse' or a 'minor light'. Former NLB lighthouses now disposed of are not included in the list.

Scotland (except principal island groups)

Major lighthouses

Minor lights

 Ardtornish
 Bass Rock
 Cailleach Head
 Cairnbulg Briggs
 Corran Narrows North East
 Corran Point
 Craigton Point
 Dunollie
 Elie Ness
 Hestan Island
 Holy Island (Inner)
 Lady Isle
 Little Ross
 Little Ross Beacon
 Loch Eriboll
 Loch Ryan
 Longman Point
 Oban NLB Pier
 Sandaig
 Sgeir Bhuidhe
 Sula Sgeir
 Turnberry

The Hebrides

Major lighthouses

 Barra Head
 Butt of Lewis
 Dubh Artach
 Eilean Glas
 Flannan Islands
 
 Hyskeir
 Lismore
 Monach
 Neist Point
 
 Rinns of Islay
 
 Ruvaal
 Scarinish
 Skerryvore
 Tiumpan Head
 Ushenish

Minor lights

 An T-Iasgair
 Ardmore
 Ardtreck
 Bunessan
 Cabbage North
 Cabbage South
 Cairn na Burgh More
 Cairns of Coll
 Calvay
 Canna
 Carragh an t'Sruith
 Carragh Mhor
 Channel Rock (Castlebay)
 Crowlin
 Drowning Rock
 Duart Point
 Dubh Sgeir (Castlebay)
 Dubh Sgeir (Kerrera)
 Dubh Sgeir (Leverburgh)
 Dubh Sgeir (Luing)
 Dunvegan
 Eigg
 Eight Metre Rock
 Eilean a Chuirn
 Eilean Bàn
 Eilean nan Gabhar
 Eilean Trodday
 Eileanan Dubha
 Eyre Point
 Fladda
 Gamhna Gigha
 The Garvellachs
 Gasay Island
 Gasker
 Green Island
 Grey Rocks
 Janes Tower
 Kyle Rhea
 L2
 L2a
 Lady Rock
 Leverburgh (Front)
 Leverburgh (Rear)
 Loch Indaal (Rubh an Duin)
 McArthur's Head
 Milaid Point
 Na Cuiltean
 Narstay
 North Spit Of Kerrera
 Ornsay Beacon
 Port Ellen Sector
 Red Rock
 Reisa an T-struith
 Ruadh Sgeir
 Rubh'a Chruidh
 Rubh Glas (Front)
 Rubh Glas (Rear)
 Rubh Uisenis
 Rubha nan Gall
 Scalasaig
 Sgeir Chruaidh
 Sgeir-na-Cailleach
 Skervuile
 Sleat Point
 Vaternish
 Weavers Point

Orkney

Major lighthouses

 Auskerry
 Brough of Birsay
 Cantick Head
 Copinsay
 Hoy Sound (High)
 Hoy Sound (Low)
 North Ronaldsay
 Noup Head
 Pentland Skerries
 Start Point
 Tor Ness

Minor lights

 Barrel of Butter
 Calf of Eday
 Cava
 Helliar Holm
 Hoxa Head
 Lother Rock
 Papa Stronsay
 Roseness
 Ruff Reef
 Skerry of Ness
 Swona

Shetland

Major lighthouses

 Bressay
 Eshaness
 Fair Isle North
 Fair Isle South
 Firths Voe
 Foula
 Muckle Flugga
 Out Skerries
 Point of Fethaland
 Sumburgh Head

Minor lights

 Bagi Stack
 Balta Sound
 Brother Isle
 Bullia Skerry
 Fugla Ness
 Gruney
 Head Of Mula
 Hillswick
 Holm Of Skaw
 Hoo Stack
 Little Holm
 Lunna Holm
 Mousa
 Muckle Holm
 Muckle Roe
 Muckle Skerry
 Mull of Eswick
 Ness Of Sound
 Outer Skerry
 Rova Head
 Rumble Rock
 Skate of Marrister
 Suther Ness
 Symbister Ness
 Uyea Sound
 Vaila Sound
 Ve Skerries
 Wether Holm
 Whitehill

Isle of Man

Major lighthouses

 Chicken Rock
 Douglas Head
 Maughold Head
 Point of Ayre

Minor lights
 Langness
 Thousla Rock

See also
 List of lighthouses in Scotland

References
 
 The Commissioners of Northern Lighthouses' Aids to Navigation Map 2012

Northern Lighthouse Board